James Sedillo is a former member of the Arizona House of Representatives. He served in the House from January 2001 through January 2003. He ran for re-election in 2002, but lost in the Democratic primary.

References

Hispanic and Latino American state legislators in Arizona
Democratic Party members of the Arizona House of Representatives